Ymir is a fictional character appearing in American comic books published by Marvel Comics. He is based on the frost giant of the same name from Norse mythology.

Publication history

Ymir first appears in Journey into Mystery #97 (October 1963) and was adapted by Stan Lee and Jack Kirby.

Fictional character biography
The character Ymir first appears in Journey into Mystery, and considers all other forms of life — with the exception of his kin the Frost Giants of Niffelheim — to be aberrations that must be destroyed. He was among the first Asgardian creatures to be created and spawned the Asgardian gods. The next story depicts an early battle with and subsequent imprisonment by being lured into a trap and imprisoned in a ring of magical fire by Odin, King of the Norse gods while attempting to bring eternal winter to Asgard with the other giants.

Ymir is mentioned in Savage Tales in a story set in the prehistoric Hyborian Age. Barbarian hero Conan encounters his daughter, Atali, and slays two of her brutish brothers.

Ymir reappears in a two-part storyline in Avengers and Doctor Strange being summoned to Earth with the fire demon Surtur by a cult called the Sons of Satannish. The pair are defeated and banished when the heroes trick the two into fighting one another due to Strange. Ymir and Surtur reappear in Thor, and invade the realm of Asgard. Both characters, however, are defeated when God of Thunder Thor uses the Odinpower to banish the pair to the other-dimensional Sea of Eternal Night. Ymir reappears in the publication Marvel Super-Heroes, and with the Frost and Storm Giants launches attack on Asgard. On this occasion the character and his allies are stopped by Thor and his half-brother, Vidar.

Ymir appears in an issue of the limited series X-Men: First Class, which is set during the early days of the modern Marvel universe. The original X-Men encounter a group called the "Sons of the Vanir" who summon Ymir to Earth. After a brief battle, Thor uses his mystic hammer Mjolnir to return Ymir to Niffelheim.

Ymir makes another return in the pages of A+X. He has fashioned a version of the Casket Of Ancient Winters and plans to freeze the world. Thor confronts him with the X-Men Bobby Drake, AKA Iceman. Bobby is powered up by this new Casket and is the deciding force in Ymir's defeat.

Powers and abilities
Ymir is a large frost giant over 1,000 feet (300 m) tall with physical attributes far greater than most others. He can project intense, deadly cold and regenerate from as little as an ice particle. Ymir wields an enormous icicle that functions as a club for destruction or battle. He is vulnerable to extreme heat that melts him down.

Other versions

Free Comic Book Day
Ymir is the villain in the giveaway title Free Comic Book Day 2009 Avengers.

In other media

Television
 Ymir appears in the Spider-Man and His Amazing Friends episode "The Vengeance of Loki" voiced by John Stephenson.
 Ymir appears in The Avengers: Earth's Mightiest Heroes episode "The Fall of Asgard", voiced by Rick D. Wasserman.
 Ymir appears in the Hulk and the Agents of S.M.A.S.H. episode "Hulks on Ice". He is awakened from his ice volcano prison on Earth by Laufey as part of the Frost Giants' plot to bring an endless winter to Earth. Ymir then attacks Thor and the Hulks as they work to defeat Ymir. When Skaar tried to repeatedly stab Ymir, he froze Skaar who was caught by A-Bomb before he can hit the ground. Thor tells Hulk that they will have to find Ymir's weak spot. Skaar's sword was left in Ymir as the Hulk's act as they attack the weak spot. Before Ymir can hit A-Bomb, She-Hulk gets both of them out of the way. Thor comes up with a plan where he and Hulk attack Red Hulk enough to heat him up and throws him towards Ymir which cracks up Ymir. Thor then fires his lightning which shatters Ymir as Laufey retreats back to Jotunheim.
 Ymir appears in the Ultimate Spider-Man episode "Contest of Champions" Pt. 2. After Spider-Man, Captain America, Red Hulk, and Iron Fist remove Sandman from the game of "Capture the Flag," Grandmaster pairs Ymir and Blastaar against the heroes. Ymir managed to freeze Captain America removing him from the game before Red Hulk could thaw him. After Red Hulk, Blastaar, and Iron Fist are removed from the game, Spider-Man was left to fight Ymir after claiming the flag. Spider-Man managed to defeat Ymir by using an electrical wire on him.
 Ymir appears in Marvel Super Hero Adventures: Frost Fight!, voiced by Fred Tatasciore. He collaborates with Loki to steal the powers of Santa Claus.

Video games
 Ymir appears as a boss in Marvel: Ultimate Alliance, voiced by Paul Eiding.
 Ymir appears in Thor: God of Thunder (based on the live-action film), voiced by Mitch Lewis.
 Ymir appears as a villain character in Marvel Super Hero Squad Online.
 Ymir appears as a villain character in Marvel: Avengers Alliance.
 Ymir appears in Thor: The Dark World - The Official Game, voiced by Tyler Bunch.
 Ymir is featured as an enemy in the Thor virtual pinball game for Pinball FX 2 released by Zen Studios.
 Ymir appears as a non-playable boss in World boss invasion in Marvel Future Fight by Netmarble.

References

Characters created by Jack Kirby
Characters created by Stan Lee
Comics characters introduced in 1963
Fictional characters with ice or cold abilities
Fictional characters with immortality
Fictional characters with superhuman durability or invulnerability
Marvel Comics characters with superhuman strength
Marvel Comics giants
Marvel Comics supervillains
Thor (Marvel Comics)
Ymir